Sociedad Deportiva Ponferradina, S.A.D. is a Spanish football team based in Ponferrada, in the El Bierzo region, in the autonomous community of Castile and León. Founded on 7 June 1922, it plays in Segunda División, holding home matches at the Estadio El Toralín with a seating capacity of 8,400 spectators.

The team's kit consists of blue and white striped shirt, and blue shorts.

History
Sociedad Deportiva Ponferradina was founded in 1922. The first idea of the executive committee to arrange a stadium was to build it inside the castle of Ponferrada, which was eight centuries old. King Alfonso XIII denied the building permit, which led to the construction of Santa Marta; the opening match was played 8 September 1923, a friendly against Cultural y Deportiva Leonesa.

Ponferradina spent the vast majority of its professional years in the fourth and third divisions. In 1967, with the club in the former category, it achieved an historic 6–1 win against La Liga giants Real Madrid. Eight years later, due to financial difficulties, Santa Marta was sold, and the team relocated to Fuentesnuevas.

On 5 September 2000 El Toralín was inaugurated as the club's new grounds: the first game there was a friendly with Celta de Vigo. In 2006–07 Ponfe competed for the first time in the second level after knocking out Universidad Las Palmas and Alicante in the promotion play-offs, but would be immediately relegated back as third from the bottom.

In the 2009–10 season, Ponferradina returned to division two: after winning the regular season with 75 points it defeated Sant Andreu on penalties, in the play-offs (after winning and losing 1–0 over the two legs); subsequently, the club appeared in the league final, losing to Granada 0–1 on aggregate.

In 2010–11 Ponferradina played in the second division for the second time, meeting the same fate after finishing in 21st position. The following campaign the team finished second in its group and, after ousting Real Jaén, Lucena and Tenerife in the play-offs, promoted back.

In 2015-16 season, Ponferradina were relegated after defeated by Girona on the last matchday, finishing in 19th position.

After three seasons in the third-tier Segunda B division, on the 29th of June 2019, Ponferradina won their two-legged playoff against Hércules to secure promotion back to the Segunda División.

Rivalries
The longest rivalry of SD Ponferradina is the province of León rivalry with Cultural y Deportiva Leonesa. However, the respective first teams of the two clubs haven't played each other since Ponferradina were promoted to the Segunda División and Cultural were relegated to Tercera División in 2010.

Season to season

 10 seasons in Segunda División
 21 seasons in Segunda División B
 46 seasons in Tercera División

Current squad
.

Reserve team

Out on loan

Current technical staff

   Guillermo Vega   Samuel Cardoso

   Alejandro Vidal

Honours and Achievements
Segunda División B: 2004–05, 2007–08, 2009–10
Tercera División: 1957–58, 1965–66, 1986–87
Regional Championships: 1934–35
Castilla y León Cup: 2010–11
Teresa Herrera Trophy: 2021

Famous players

Note: this list includes players that have appeared in at least 100 league games and/or have reached international status.

Former coaches

Presidents

References

External links

Official website 
Futbolme team profile 
BDFutbol team profile

 
Association football clubs established in 1922
Segunda División clubs
1922 establishments in Spain
Football clubs in Ponferrada